Tsim Sha Tsui Central is one of the 20 constituencies in the Yau Tsim Mong District of Hong Kong created in 2015.

The constituency loosely covers Tsim Sha Tsui with the estimated population of 16,871.

Councillors represented

Election results

2010s

References

Constituencies of Hong Kong
Constituencies of Yau Tsim Mong District Council
2015 establishments in Hong Kong
Constituencies established in 2015
Tsim Sha Tsui